George Pepper Prentiss (a.k.a. George Pepper Wilson) (June 10, 1876 – September 23, 1902) was a pitcher in Major League Baseball who played from 1901 through 1902 for the Boston Americans (1901–02) and Baltimore Orioles (1902). He was born in Wilmington, Delaware.
 
In a two-season career, Prentiss posted a 3–3 record with 10 strikeouts and a 5.31 ERA in 11 appearances, including seven starts, four complete games, and 57⅓ innings of work.
 
Prentiss died in his hometown of Wilmington, Delaware, at age 26 from Typhoid Fever.

References

External links 

Retrosheet

Boston Americans players
Baltimore Orioles (1901–02) players
Major League Baseball pitchers
Baseball players from Wilmington, Delaware
1876 births
1902 deaths
Waterbury Pirates players
Waterbury Rough Riders players